The Regional Development Commissions Act 1993 is legislation passed by the Parliament of Western Australia:

to establish regional development commissions, to coordinate and promote the development of regions and to establish a regional development council.

The Act falls under the control of the Minister for Local Government and Regional Development and provides for the establishment of nine commissions:
 Gascoyne Development Commission
 Goldfields-Esperance Development Commission
 Great Southern Development Commission
 Kimberley Development Commission
 Mid West Development Commission
 Peel Development Commission
 Pilbara Development Commission
 South West Development Commission
 Wheatbelt Development Commission

See also
 Regions of Western Australia

References

External links
 Department of Regional Development and Lands website

Western Australia legislation
1993 in Australian law
1990s in Western Australia